Pimenta racemosa is a species of plant in the myrtle family (Myrtaceae) that is native to the Caribbean region. Common names include West Indian bay tree, bay rum tree, and ciliment. It is used in cooking and an essential oil is distilled to produce a fragrant cologne called bay rum; although the name is similar to names of flavored alcoholic beverages, the concentrated essential oil from the fruit is toxic and renders the product undrinkable. The leaves are also used for herbal teas. The tree is 4–12 m tall and the white flowers, about 10 mm wide, become black, oval fruits measuring 7–12 mm. The plants are now grown widely in other tropical areas, including Oceania. The ideal conditions for P. racemosa are regular irrigation and bright sunshine.

Ecology
Pimenta racemosa is widely introduced and can become an invasive weed.

Anti-inflammatory and antinociceptive properties 
Extracts from multiple varieties of Pimenta racemosa display anti-inflammatory properties. These properties are mediated in part by terpenes such as abietic acid and lupeol, which alter neutrophil migration into inflamed regions.

Pimenta racemosa also demonstrates antinociceptive properties and has historically been used as an analgesic in the Caribbean.

References

External links

racemosa
Plants described in 1933
Trees of the Caribbean
Flora without expected TNC conservation status